Krasne is an urban-type settlement in Zolochiv Raion of Lviv Oblast in Ukraine. The settlement is located east of the city of Lviv, on the left bank of the Poltva, a right tributary of the Bug. It hosts the administration of Krasne settlement hromada, one of the hromadas of Ukraine. Population: 

Until 18 July 2020, Krasne belonged to Busk Raion. The raion was abolished in July 2020 as part of the administrative reform of Ukraine, which reduced the number of raions of Lviv Oblast to seven. The area of Busk Raion was merged into Zolochiv Raion.

Economy

Transportation
The settlement has access to Highway M06 connecting Lviv with Kyiv via Rivne and Zhytomyr, and to Highway M09 connecting Lviv with Ternopil.

Krasne railway station is where the railway line from Lviv branches into two, running to Rivne and to Ternopil. There is passenger traffic.

References

Urban-type settlements in Zolochiv Raion